Hawaa Hawaai  is a 2014 Indian sports drama film directed by Amole Gupte. The film features Partho Gupte and Saqib Saleem. The film is produced by Fox Star Studios. Saleem portrays a roller skating coach in the film. Gupte also composed and sang one song for the film. Rest of the songs were composed by Hitesh Sonik. Amol Gole, a long time collaborator with Gupte, worked as the cinematographer. The film released in theatres on 9 May 2014 with good reviews.

Plot
The plot centres around Arjun Harishchand Waghmare and his dream to skate. The film chronicles his coach Aniket Bhargava and Arjun's journey towards being a champion skater.

After his father's death, Arjun and his family move to Mumbai. Arjun starts to work at a tea stall where he sees some children arrive at night for Lucky (Aniket) Sir. He sees that the children are skating and gets attracted to skating. He finds the skates too expensive so his four friends make a pair of skates out of garbage and call it hawaa hawaai. Aniket gets impressed by Arjun and decides to teach him skating. Arjun comes out to be very talented and Aniket decides to send him to participate in the district-level skating race. On the day of the race, Arjun gets missing. Aniket finds that he is ill and immediately takes him to a hospital where he learns that Arjun has hepatitis. Arjun gets cured and Aniket learns about the difficulties of the poor child about the lack of proper food, sleep, and continuous workload. He realizes that Arjun and his friends have a big heart and they need to be educated. He tries to help them. All his other students come to meet Arjun and bring him nutritional supplements. Aniket decides to send Arjun to the state-level skating race and registers him from his hometown (Yavatmal district). Arjun remembers of his father and wins the race. The film ends showing that Arjun and his friends are admitted in a school and an article is printed in the newspaper about Arjun.

Cast
 Partho Gupte as Arjun Harishchand Waghmare / Raju
 Saqib Saleem as Aniket Bhargava / Lucky Sir
 Pragya Yadav as Pragya Nanda
 Makarand Deshpande as Harishchand Waghmare (Arjun's father) 
 Devraya Gole
 Anuj Sachdeva as Aniruddha Bhargava (Aniket's elder brother)
 Bugs Bhargava as Mr. Baksh Bhargava, Aniket's father (photo only)
 Razak Khan as Garage Mechanic
 Neha Joshi as Mrs. Waghmare, Arjun's mother
 Rekha Kamat
 Sanjay Dadich
 Sanjay Tripathi
 Dhiraj Utmani as Lucky Sir's skating coach
 Hardik Raheja
 Srishti Sharma
 Arjun Nichani
 Manav Hirey
 Zufin
 Saba Qureshi
 Aaliya Qureshi
 Solya Qureshi
 Suman Arjun Mahaskar
 Thirupathi N. Kushnapelli
 Salman Chhote Khan
 Ashfaque Bismillah Khan
 Maaman Memon
 Mahesh Kumar
 Jaival Shah
 Khushi Shah
 Sunidhi Chauhan (special appearance)
 Riyansh Bhatia

Production
As of 27 August 2013, shooting of the film began in Mumbai.

Critical reception 
Hawaa Hawaai got mostly positive reviews from critics. Subhash K. Jha gave it 4.5 Stars and said that "Hawaa Hawaai is an extraordinary saga of ordinary lives, the kind we often pass by at traffic signals". Joginder Tuteja called it a "Touching Tale" and rated it 3.5 stars.

References

External links
 
 
 

2010s Hindi-language films
English-language Indian films
2014 films
Films shot in India
Indian children's films
Fox Star Studios films
Roller skating films